House of Yes: Live from House of Blues is a live album and video by the English progressive rock band Yes, released on 25 September 2000 by Eagle Records in the United Kingdom and by Beyond Music in the United States. It is a recording of the band's performance at the House of Blues at Mandalay Bay in Las Vegas on 31 October 1999 during their world tour supporting their eighteenth studio album The Ladder. By the time of the album's release, guitarist Billy Sherwood and keyboardist Igor Khoroshev were already out of the band, reducing Yes to a four-piece.

The album peaked at No. 154 on the UK Albums Chart and failed to chart in the US. A DVD of the concert was also released in 2000, but omits the group performing "Close to the Edge" and "Hearts".

Track listing

Disc one
"Yours Is No Disgrace" (Jon Anderson, Chris Squire, Steve Howe, Tony Kaye, Bill Bruford) – 13:03
"Time and a Word" (Anderson, David Foster) – 0:58
"Homeworld (The Ladder)" (Anderson, Howe, Billy Sherwood, Squire, Alan White, Igor Khoroshev) – 9:44
"Perpetual Change" (Anderson, Squire) – 10:48
"Lightning Strikes" (Anderson, Howe, Sherwood, Squire, White, Khoroshev) – 5:07
"The Messenger" (Anderson, Howe, Sherwood, Squire, White, Khoroshev) – 6:39
"Ritual (Nous Sommes Du Soleil)" (Anderson, Howe, Squire, Rick Wakeman, White) – 0:59
"And You and I" (Anderson; themes by Bruford, Howe, Squire) – 11:22
I. "Cord of Life"
II. "Eclipse" (Anderson; Squire, Bruford)
III. "The Preacher the Teacher"
IV. "Apocalypse"

Disc two
"It Will Be a Good Day (The River)" (Anderson, Howe, Sherwood, Squire, White, Khoroshev) – 6:28
"Face to Face" (Anderson, Howe, Sherwood, Squire, White, Khoroshev) – 5:32
"Awaken" (Anderson, Howe) – 17:35
"I've Seen All Good People" – 7:27
a. "Your Move" (Anderson)
b. "All Good People" (Squire)
"Cinema" (Squire, Trevor Rabin, White, Kaye) – 1:57
"Owner of a Lonely Heart" (Rabin, Anderson, Squire, Trevor Horn) – 6:03
"Roundabout" (Anderson, Howe) – 7:40

Personnel
Yes
Jon Anderson – lead vocals
Steve Howe – lead and acoustic guitars, steel guitar, backing vocals
Billy Sherwood – guitars, backing vocals
Chris Squire – bass guitars, backing vocals
Alan White – drums, percussion, backing vocals
Igor Khoroshev – keyboards, backing vocals

Production
Biff Dawes – engineer
Kris Solem – mastering
Mike Plotnikoff – mixing
Roger Dean – artwork, cover
Martyn Dean – design
Gottlieb Bros. – photography
Robin Kauffman – photography

References

Yes (band) live albums
Albums with cover art by Roger Dean (artist)
2000 live albums
Albums recorded at the House of Blues
Albums recorded at the House of Blues (Las Vegas)
Mandalay Bay